The 2014 Arizona Secretary of State election took place on November 4, 2018, to elect the Secretary of State of Arizona, concurrently with other statewide elections, including for governor and U.S. House.

Incumbent Republican Secretary of State Ken Bennett was term-limited and ineligible to run for a third term in office. He instead ran unsuccessfully for the Republican nomination for governor. Republican nominee Michele Reagan succeeded Bennett and won the election against Democratic challenger Terry Goddard.

As of 2022, this is the last time that a Republican has been elected Secretary of State in Arizona.

Republican primary

Candidates 
 Wil Cardon, businessman and candidate for U.S. Senate in 2012
 Justin Pierce, state representative
 Michele Reagan, state senator and former state representative

Campaign 
Wil Cardon was initially considered the front-runner, but support for him collapsed in the wake of revelations that six of his siblings were suing him for more than $6 million of family money that they allege he used in his campaign for the U.S. Senate in 2012, despite it not being his to use.

Polling

Results

Democratic primary

Candidates 
 Terry Goddard, former Attorney General and candidate for governor in 1990, 1994, and 2010

Results

General election

Endorsements

Polling

Results

References 

Secretary of State
Arizona
Arizona Secretary of State elections